"High Five" is the second solo single of Japanese idol Yuma Nakayama. The single includes "High Five" as theme song for NTV's "Sukkiri!!" and coupling song "Ai made ga Knife" for FUJI TV's drama "Tengoku no Koi"'s ending theme song. Limited Edition B includes DVD from Nakayama Yuma's event for his first single Missing Piece in Osaka-ORIX theater.

Release 
The single was released on April 2, 2014. The single had an event called "High Five with nakayama Yuma" which held in various Aeon malls throughout Japan. The event sold a special CD only with a 2page jacket, a CD which includes the song High Five.

Track listing 
Limited Edition 1 – Single (CD＋DVD)  
CD
 "High Five"
 "Ai made ga Knife"
 "High Five (original karaoke)"
 "Ai made ga Knife (original karaoke)"

DVD
 "High Five PV"
 "High Five PV Making"

 2 face 4 page Jacket
Limited Edition 2 – Single (CD＋DVD)

CD
 "High Five"
 "Ai made ga Knife"
 "High Five (original karaoke)"
 "Ai made ga Knife (original karaoke)"

DVD
 "NAKAYAMA YUMA with KANSAI Johnnys' Jr. in ORIX THEATER"

 2 face 4 page Jacket
Regular Edition – Single (CD)
 "High Five"
 "Ai made ga Knife"
 "so Crazy"
 "BLOSSOM TREE"

 3 face 6 page Jacket
Freebies
LE A Clear file A (A4 size)
LE B Clear file B (A4 size)
Regular Edition Poster (B2 size)
note: freebies are only available to certain store and is limited.

Charts and certifications

References

External links
 High Five Johnnys net
 High Five JEHP
 Lyrics of this song - High Five

2014 singles
2014 songs
Songs with lyrics by Gorō Matsui